Liv Elisabeth Grannes  (28 June 1918 — 30 November 2004) was a Norwegian resistance member during World War II.

Early life 
Liv Grannes was born in Mosjøen in northern Norway on 28 June 1918. Her father, Jørgen Albert Grannes, was a teacher and organist and her mother was Emelie Anette (née Vedde). She had two younger brothers. Liv Grannes studied art at Orkdal High School, graduating in 1938.

Resistance activities 
In 1940, she was employed as an office lady at the police station in Mosjøen.

As a woman at the police station, she had a unique opportunity to provide assistance to the resistance during the Second World War. From the Spring of 1941 she was a permanent agent for the British Special Operations Executive (SOE), which conducted resistance work in Helgeland.

The Majavat affair

Activities in London 
After the Majavas tragedy, she had to flee to Sweden in 1942 and on to England. She continued her resistance work. In London she was in 1944 married to Birger Sjøberg.

In 1946, Liv Sjøberg, as she was then called, was decorated with George Medal by the British ambassador in Oslo.

Personal life 
In 1958, Liv Sjøberg married the Norwegian Minister of Justice, Jens Christian Hauge.

Death and legacy 

She died in Oslo on 30 November 2004.

Liv Grannes' road on Andås in Vefsn is named after her.

In 2021, a documentary film about Grannes resistance activities was made, titled "Jeanne D'Arc of the North".

See also 

 Norwegian resistance movement
List of recipients of the George Medal in the 1940s

References

1918 births
2004 deaths
Norwegian resistance members
Female resistance members of World War II
Special Operations Executive personnel
People from Helgeland
Recipients of the George Medal